Melissa Depraetere (born 12 May 1992 in Kortrijk) is a Belgian politician and member of Vooruit. She has been a member of the Chamber of Representatives for West Flanders since 2019.

Depraetere was also active in Chiro Flanders, a Belgian youth organisation.

In November 2018, it was announced that Depraetere would be in second place on the sp.a list for the 2019 election, behind then-party leader John Crombez. She won 12,601 votes and gained a seat in the Chamber of Representatives.

She is a member of the Committee for the Economy, Consumer Protection and the Digital Agenda, the COVID-19 Committee, and the Committee for Electoral Expenses.

See also

List of members of the Chamber of Representatives of Belgium, 2019–2024

References

Living people
1992 births
People from Kortrijk
Socialistische Partij Anders politicians
21st-century Belgian women politicians
21st-century Belgian politicians
Members of the Chamber of Representatives (Belgium)